is a Japanese television writer, whose work also covers publishing and film. She worked briefly in 2007 on the United States web show lonelygirl15 as a writer, director, and producer.

Career
Born in Yokohama in 1970, Aoyagi graduated from Sophia University (Jōchi Daigaku). She debuted as a screenwriter in 1995, penning the fourth episode of the Fuji TV series Seiga wa tatsu. In 1996, her two-hour telefilm, Saigo no kazoku ryokō: Family Affair for Tokyo Broadcasting System earned a special recommendation Galaxy Award. Her latest project is $5.2 million, the world's biggest Internet show, "The Scary City" that launched on September 15, 2008.

Filmography as writer
 Tomoko no baai (1996)
 Hitorigurashi (1996) 
 Moonlight Express (1999)
 Okuman chôja to kekkon suru hôhô (2000)
 Pretty Girls (2002) 
 Kokoro (156 episodes, 2003)
 Manhattan Diaries (2007)
 Lonelygirl15 (7 episodes, 2007) 
 The Scary City (20 episodes, 2007-2009)

References

External links
 

1970 births
Living people
Japanese screenwriters
People from Yokohama